The 2012 Atlantic Hockey Tournament was the 9th Atlantic Hockey Tournament. It was played between March 2 and March 17, 2012 at campus locations and at the Blue Cross Arena in Rochester, New York, United States. Air Force won their 5th tournament and earned Atlantic Hockey's automatic bid to the 2012 NCAA Division I Men's Ice Hockey Tournament after defeating RIT in the championship game.

Format
The tournament features four rounds of play. In the first round the fifth and twelfth, sixth and eleventh, seventh and tenth, and eighth and ninth seeds, as determined by the conference regular season standings, play a best-of-three series with the winners advancing to the quarterfinals. The top four teams from the conference regular season standings receive a bye to the quarterfinals. There, the first seed and lowest-ranked first-round winner, the second seed and second-lowest-ranked first-round winner, the third seed and second-highest-ranked first-round winner, and the fourth seed and the highest-ranked first-round winner play a best-of-three series, with the winners advancing to the semifinals. In the semifinals, the highest and lowest seeds and second-highest and second-lowest seeds play a single game, with the winner advancing to the championship game. The tournament champion received an automatic bid to the 2012 NCAA Division I Men's Ice Hockey Tournament.

Current standings
Note: GP = Games played; W = Wins; L = Losses; T = Ties; PTS = Points; GF = Goals For; GA = Goals Against

Bracket

Note: * denotes overtime period(s)

Results

First round

(5) Holy Cross vs. (12) Army

(6) Bentley vs. (11) Sacred Heart

(7) Robert Morris vs. (10) American International

(8) Connecticut vs. (9) Canisius

Quarterfinals

(1) Air Force vs. (8) Connecticut

(2) Niagara vs. (7) Robert Morris

(3) RIT vs. (6) Bentley

(4) Mercyhurst vs. (5) Holy Cross

Semifinals

(1) Air Force vs. (4) Mercyhurst

(2) Niagara vs. (3) RIT

Championship

(1) Air Force vs. (3) RIT

Tournament awards

All-Tournament Team
G Jason Torf* (Air Force)
D Tim Kirby (Air Force)
D Scott Mathis (Air Force)
F Taylor MacReynolds (RIT)
F Cole Gunner (Air Force)
F Paul Weisgarber (Air Force)
* Most Valuable Player(s)

References

Atlantic Hockey Tournament
Atlantic Hockey Tournament